Chicago: Music From the Miramax Motion Picture is a soundtrack album featuring all of the original songs of the 2002 Best Picture Academy Award-winning musical film Chicago starring Renée Zellweger, Catherine Zeta-Jones, Richard Gere, Queen Latifah, John C. Reilly, Mýa Harrison and Christine Baranski.

Track listing

 "Class" was filmed but cut from the final editing of the movie. The footage was later included on the DVD release and in the film's broadcast television premiere on NBC in 2005
 "I Move On" is a song which Kander and Ebb wrote directly for the film adaptation, thus is not featured on the original Broadway musical.
 Songs not featured in the film, bonus tracks.
  A music video was released for the song but it was never officially released as a CD single for a worldwide market, as promoting it would have been impossible due to the singer's recently announced battle with breast cancer at that time. When Anastacia was shooting the video she had a 40 °C (104 °F) degree fever.

Awards
The album won the 2004 Grammy Award for Best Compilation Soundtrack Album for a Motion Picture, Television or Other Visual Media and was nominated for Best Song Written for a Motion Picture, Television or Other Visual Media
The song "I Move On" was nominated for an Academy Award for Best Original Song
The song "Cell Block Tango" won a Florida Film Critics Circle Award for Best Song
The song "Love Is a Crime" was nominated for a Satellite Award for Best Original Song
The song "All That Jazz" singing by Catherine Zeta-Jones and Renée Zellweger appears in AFI's 100 Years...100 Songs list on 98th place

Chart performance
The album fared well on four of the Billboard charts, reaching #2 on the Billboard 200 chart. The soundtrack has sold 2,417,000 copies, as of February 2013.

Weekly charts

Year-end charts

Certifications

References

2002 soundtrack albums
Musical film soundtracks
Albums produced by Ric Wake
Albums recorded at Metalworks Studios
Grammy Award for Best Compilation Soundtrack for Visual Media
Crime film soundtracks